Atilano Cordero Badillo (born c. 1944 in Moca, Puerto Rico) is a Puerto Rican entrepreneur and supermarket owner.

Career
In 1967 he founded Supermercados Grande where he remains as President and he is also President of Empresas Cordero Badillo. Cordero Badillo has developed Food Price stores in Puerto Rico which are based on the warehouse model of food sales. Cordero Badillo is President of the Chamber of the Food Marketing & Distribution Industry (MIDA) Through his career he has won numerous awards, and he belongs to the Top Business Leaders association of Puerto Rico's Hall of Fame. He was named president of that organization from 1986 to 1990.

Personal
Cordero Badillo is married to Puerto Rican television news anchorwoman Cyd Marie Fleming.

See also
List of Puerto Ricans

References

Cordero Badillo, Atilano
American businesspeople in retailing
Cordero Badillo, Atilano
People from Moca, Puerto Rico
Puerto Rican businesspeople